The 2004 Gatorade 125s were a pair of NASCAR Nextel Cup Series held on Thursday, February 12, 2004, that were the qualifying races for that year's Daytona 500, the premier event of the 2004 NASCAR Nextel Cup Series. The pair of 50-lap races was held in Daytona Beach, Florida at Daytona International Speedway, a 2.5 miles (4.0 km) permanent triangular-shaped superspeedway. The first race was won by Dale Earnhardt Jr. of Dale Earnhardt, Inc., who held off the field after passing teammate Michael Waltrip on lap 36. The second race was won by Elliott Sadler of Robert Yates Racing.

Background 

Daytona International Speedway is one of six superspeedways to hold NASCAR races; the others are Michigan International Speedway, Auto Club Speedway, Indianapolis Motor Speedway, Pocono Raceway and Talladega Superspeedway. Its standard track is a four-turn,  superspeedway. Daytona's turns are banked at 31 degrees and the front stretch (the location of the finish line) is banked at 18 degrees.

In the early years, qualifying for the Daytona 500 had varying formats: from one timed lap, to the average of two laps, to the better of two laps. The idea of having two individual races to establish the starting lineup of the Daytona 500 dates back to the first race in 1959. The first of the 100-mile (160 km) qualifying races consisted of Convertible division cars and the second of Grand National cars. Prior to 1971, the races yielded points to the Drivers' Championship. Large well-established teams approach the races as practice sessions for the Daytona 500 while a successful qualification into the Daytona 500 for smaller less-established teams would allow them to enter future NASCAR events during the season. An unsuccessful qualification meant the team would risk closing down until sponsorship was found. Corporate sponsors purchased naming rights to qualifying races; between 1981 and 1984, Uno cards was the title sponsor for the "Uno Twin 125’s" qualifying events. In 1985 they became known as "7-Eleven Twin 125's"; no sponsors funded the 1988, 1989 and 1990 qualifying events and the races were called "Daytona Twin Qualifiers". The races were rebranded as the "Budweiser Duels" in 2013 and became known as the "Can-Am Duels" in 2016.

The Twin 125-Mile Qualifying Races would determine positions 3 through 30. The drivers who posted the odd-number rankings in the qualifying rounds compete in the first race, which will set the inside rows -- positions 3, 5, 7, etc. -- for the Daytona 500. The even-number rankings from the timed qualifying compete in the second 125-mile race and set the outside rows -- positions 4, 6, 8, etc. In the event of cancellation, the top 30 positions would be set from the timed qualifying sessions. Starting positions 31 through 38 are determined by qualifying speeds set in qualifying. The 30 cars in the field are removed from the equation, and the remaining cars with the fastest official qualifying speeds fill the six positions. Starting positions 39 through 42 are provisionals assigned beginning with the car owner ranked highest in the previous Winston Cup championship points standings who did not qualify for positions 1 through 38. Starting position 43 is assigned to any car owner who has a past NASCAR Winston Cup champion driver who participated in the Winston Cup Series last season and did not otherwise qualify. The most recent past champion driver not assigned a position will receive this starting spot. If the 43rd position remains unused, it will be assigned to the next eligible owner based on last seasons final owner points standings.

Entry list

Qualifying 
Daytona 500 qualifying for positions 1-2 and the starting positions for the Duels was held on Sunday, February 8, at 12:00 PM EST.  

Greg Biffle of Roush Racing would win the overall pole for the Daytona 500 and the pole for the first duel. Meanwhile, outside polesitter Elliott Sadler would get the first spot for the second duel.

Full qualifying results

Race results

References 

2004 NASCAR Nextel Cup Series
NASCAR races at Daytona International Speedway
February 2004 sports events in the United States
2004 in sports in Florida